Ashley is a city in Washington County, Illinois, United States. The population was 536 at the 2010 census.

The village was named after Colonel L. W. Ashley, a railroad division engineer.

Geography
Ashley is located at  (38.328332, -89.188860).

Demographics

As of the census of 2000, there were 613 people, 245 households, and 160 families residing in the city. The racial makeup of the city was 98.21% White, 0.16% African American, 0.82% Native American, 0.49% from other races, and 0.33% from two or more races. Hispanic or Latino of any race were 0.65% of the population.

There were 245 households, out of which 34.7% had children under the age of 18 living with them, 50.2% were married couples living together, 9.8% had a female householder with no husband present, and 34.3% were non-families. 29.0% of all households were made up of individuals, and 14.3% had someone living alone who was 65 years of age or older. The average household size was 2.50 and the average family size was 3.12.

In the city, the population was spread out, with 27.6% under the age of 18, 8.5% from 18 to 24, 28.2% from 25 to 44, 21.0% from 45 to 64, and 14.7% who were 65 years of age or older. The median age was 36 years. For every 100 females, there were 94.6 males. For every 100 females age 18 and over, there were 94.7 males.

The median income for a household in the city was $31,429, and the median income for a family was $41,000. Males had a median income of $32,404 versus $21,667 for females. The per capita income for the city was $14,694. About 10.0% of families and 17.0% of the population were below the poverty line, including 22.9% of those under age 18 and 16.2% of those age 65 or over.

Notable people
 Laird Doyle, Hollywood screenwriter
 Red Smith, Major League Baseball infielder

References

External links

Cities in Illinois
Cities in Washington County, Illinois